The discography of American hip hop recording artist Childish Gambino comprises four studio albums, fourteen mixtapes, and four EPs. After releasing his first five mixtapes and EP independently, he signed to Glassnote Records and released Camp (2011), his first album on a major record label.

Studio albums

EPs

Mixtapes

Singles

As lead artist

As featured artist

Promotional singles

Other charted and certified songs

Guest appearances

Music videos

Notes

References

Discographies of American artists
Hip hop discographies